Grandeur Terrace is a public housing estate in Tin Shui Wai, New Territories, Hong Kong, near Hong Kong Wetland Park as well as Light Rail Tin Heng and Wetland Park stop. It is the only estate in Tin Shui Wai which its name does not have the prefix "Tin" and was a HOS and PSPS court, and it is the largest PSPS in Hong Kong with 4,100 residential units. It was jointly developed by Hong Kong Housing Authority and Rich Score Development Ltd, a wholly owned subsidiary of Chun Wo Holdings Limited and it consists of eleven residential buildings completed in 2003. When it was completed, the estate was transferred to public rental housing.

Houses

Demographics
According to the 2016 by-census, Grandeur Terrace had a population of 12,518. The median age was 39.5 and the majority of residents (98.4 per cent) were of Chinese ethnicity. The average household size was 3.1 people. The median monthly household income of all households (i.e. including both economically active and inactive households) was HK$20,500.

Politics
Grandeur Terrace is located in Wang Yat constituency of the Yuen Long District Council. It was formerly represented by Mo Kai-hong, who was elected in the 2019 elections until July 2021.

See also

Public housing estates in Tin Shui Wai

References

Residential buildings completed in 2003
Tin Shui Wai
Public housing estates in Hong Kong
Private Sector Participation Scheme